

Background

Aniah Haley Blanchard (born June 22, 2000) was from Homewood, Alabama. She is the daughter of Elijah Blanchard, a Birmingham businessman, and Angela Haley-Harris, a registered nurse. Haley-Harris is currently married to UFC heavyweight fighter Walt Harris. Blanchard graduated from Homewood High School, where she played softball. At the time of her death, she was a student at Southern Union State Community College and was studying early childhood education. She was planning to transfer to Auburn University.
A scholarship in Blanchard's memory has been established by Homewood Public Schools. In June 2020, a bench at the Patriot Park in Homewood was dedicated to her.
The kidnapping and murder of Aniah Blanchard occurred in October 2019. Blanchard, the 19-year-old stepdaughter of Ultimate Fighting Championship (UFC) fighter Walt Harris, was reported missing on October 24. She had last been seen at a Chevron gas station in Auburn, Alabama, the previous night. A witness from the gas station claims to have seen Blanchard's kidnapping. Blanchard's body was found in Macon County, Alabama, one month after her disappearance. The cause of death was determined to be a gunshot wound. A suspect, identified as Ibraheem Yazeed, was arrested and charged with Blanchard's murder. As of January 2021, Yazeed is being held in Lee County Jail without bond. A judge has decided that there is probable cause for a grand jury to hear the case. Prosecutors are seeking the death penalty.

Blanchard's death attracted national attention and media coverage and led to the creation of "Aniah's law," which reforms Alabama's bail system. If Alabama voters approve Amendment One in November 2022, one of the bills that Aniah’s Law consists of will take effect.

Disappearance, investigation, and arrests
Blanchard was reported missing to the Auburn Police Department on October 24, 2019.
She had last been seen by a family member on the evening of October 23. Blanchard and her roommate exchanged several Snapchat messages in the late-night hours. At 11:09 p.m., Blanchard informed her roommate that she was close to being home. At 11:40, Blanchard told her roommate that she was with a man named Eric, whom she had just met. Blanchard's phone activity ended at 11:47 p.m. On June 3, 2020, Auburn police detective Josh Mixon testified at a preliminary hearing that the phone died or was powered off in the area of the Clarion Inn on South College Street. Blanchard's roommate and parents found her behavior to be "uncharacteristic;" and it is unclear if Blanchard herself had, in fact, sent the messages.

Surveillance video showed Blanchard in the Chevron gas station in Auburn in the late-night hours of October 23. Though Blanchard's phone has not been recovered, police were able to use records to trace her phone's movement. The phone left a Murphy Oil gas station and traveled in the direction of Longleaf Drive and Cox Road in Auburn towards a subdivision. It then went down Wire Road to Shug Jordan Parkway back to the area of the Chevron gas station. From there, it went north on South College Street towards Auburn Camp Road for a brief period before going dark in the Clarion Inn area. Blanchard's vehicle was last seen on video on a tag reader near Interstate 85, just south of Veterans Boulevard and South College Street.

Blanchard's disappearance resulted in an extensive effort to locate her. By October 30, a task force of several law enforcement agencies—including the FBI, the Department of Homeland Security, and the Alabama Department of Forensic Sciences—was formed. The disappearance and the subsequent effort to find Blanchard received national media coverage. On October 25, authorities found Blanchard's damaged vehicle. The black 2017 Honda CR-V, which police have reported seemed to be "in disarray," had been abandoned near an apartment complex in Montgomery and contained evidence of "foul play"—specifically, blood in the front passenger's seat. The blood, which was confirmed by the Alabama Department of Forensic Sciences to be that of Blanchard, "was indicative of someone suffering a life-threatening injury." In addition to blood, investigators found a bullet hole in the passenger side door and shell casings in the left cup holder. Police have also reported that there was an odor of cleaning solution, such as ammonia or Clorox.

On November 6, the Auburn Police Department released an image from a surveillance video of a "person of interest." The following day, the person of interest was identified as 29-year-old Ibraheem Yazeed of Montgomery. Surveillance video showed that he was in the store at the same time as Blanchard. He is seen buying alcohol and looking in Blanchard's direction.
He was also captured exiting the passenger side of Blanchard's vehicle. Surveillance video from another gas station shows his re-entering the passenger's side of her car. Blanchard and Yazeed are then seen leaving the station together.
In addition to surveillance footage, a witness allegedly saw Blanchard and Yazeed interacting outside the store near her car.
The witness also claims to have seen him force her into the car against her will and then leave with her in the vehicle.
According to detectives, the witness told a companion about the event but was told to mind his business.
Yazeed allegedly told another witness that he had Blanchard's vehicle but would not allow the witness to see Blanchard at that time. The witness also claims that Yazeed said he shot a girl after she "went for the gun." At the time of Blanchard's death, Yazeed was free on a $295,000 bond. He had been charged with possession of marijuana, robbery, kidnapping, and attempted murder.
The charges are connected to an alleged crime in January 2019, during which four assailants robbed and beat two men in a hotel in Montgomery. One of the victims, a 77-year-old man, was reportedly left "unconscious, unresponsive, severely injured and near death." The suspect is also accused of attempting to kill two police officers in 2012 by ramming his car into theirs and was arrested in 2017 for aggravated battery on a police officer. In June 2020, Yazeed was charged with the 2018 murder of Stephen Hamby. He was also charged with the attempted murder of a woman who was shot in the face during the incident in which Hamby was killed.

On November 7, police issued an arrest warrant for Yazeed on suspicion of first-degree kidnapping.
A tip led police to Pensacola, Florida; and the Florida Regional Fugitive Task Force located him near Interstate 10's Pine Forest Road exit. The suspect fled on foot and refused to comply with Marshall's verbal commands, leading them to "physically remove him from his hiding spot." He was taken to the Escambia County Jail and subsequently agreed to be extradited back to Alabama. He has been held in the Lee County Jail without bond since then. He was moved to solitary confinement after his attorneys filed court documents claiming that he was facing death threats. A judge has determined that there is enough probable cause to proceed to grand jury hearings. The judge also issued a gag order preventing Yazeed's attorneys, prosecutors, and witnesses from speaking to the media about the case.

On November 22, police arrested Antwain "Squirmy" Fisher, alleging that he disposed of evidence and provided transportation for Yazeed. Fisher had previously served three years in prison for his part in a drug-deal-related murder. On November 25, police arrested a third suspect, David Johnson, Jr., and charged him with hindering prosecution.
Charges against Fisher and Johnson were later dismissed. In regards to the dismissal of Fisher's charges, District Attorney Brandon Hughes stated that "it was determined that Mr. Fisher's conduct did not rise to the level of accomplice liability as was originally charged and as is required under Alabama law." In June 2020, it was revealed that Fisher had spoken to investigators about the crime. According to Fisher, Yazeed came to the home of David Johnson, Sr., on October 24, 2019, between around 5:00 a.m. and 6:00 a.m. Fisher claimed to have seen Blanchard's vehicle parked near some bushes during this time. Yazeed allegedly told Fisher that he needed more gas for Blanchard's vehicle. Fisher took Yazeed to the gas station where they purchased gasoline before going back to Johnson's residence. Yazeed allegedly informed Fisher that he needed to pick something up and Fisher drove him north on Interstate 85 towards Shorter. Fisher said that the pair stopped in Montgomery, where Yazeed obtained the item he wanted, a type of assault rifle. The two then allegedly went to a cemetery off I-85. There, Fisher claimed to have seen Yazeed drag what appeared to be two legs wrapped in a comforter. Yazeed is said to have spent some time in the woods before returning to the vehicle. Fisher said he confronted Yazeed, saying something to the effect of "tell me that's not a body,” to which Yazeed replied, "it won't come back on you and your family.”

On November 25, human remains were found in Macon County, in the woods off County Road 2. Investigators discovered a skull, which appeared to have a bullet hole in the top. Along with the remains was clothing similar to what Blanchard had last been seen wearing, as well as a lead projectile. On November 27, the remains were identified as Blanchard's. An autopsy determined that Blanchard was killed by a gunshot wound. The charges against Yazeed were then upgraded from first-degree kidnapping to capital murder. He currently faces two counts of capital murder, one for committing a murder in a car through the use of a deadly weapon while the victim is in a vehicle, and the other for committing a murder during a kidnapping in the first degree. District Attorney Hughes's office is seeking the death penalty. A preliminary hearing was scheduled for March. It was later moved to April but was again postponed due to the COVID-19 outbreak. During the hearing, which was finally held on June 3, Auburn police detective Josh Mixon gave testimony about the case. Defense attorneys disputed the prosecution's claim that the crime was committed in Lee County. Upon hearing the evidence, Judge Russell Bush found probable cause to send the case to a Lee County Grand Jury.

On March 23, Yazeed allegedly assaulted several corrections officers. He was charged with second-degree assault.

Victim

Aniah Haley Blanchard (born June 22, 2000) was from Homewood, Alabama. She is the daughter of Elijah Blanchard, a Birmingham businessman, and Angela Haley-Harris, a registered nurse. Haley-Harris is currently married to UFC heavyweight fighter Walt Harris. Blanchard graduated from Homewood High School, where she played softball. At the time of her death, she was a student at Southern Union State Community College and was studying early childhood education. She was planning to transfer to Auburn University.
A scholarship in Blanchard's memory has been established by Homewood Public Schools. In June 2020, a bench at the Patriot Park in Homewood was dedicated to her.

Aftermath
Blanchard's disappearance and death attracted national attention and media coverage. Alabama Governor Kay Ivey issued a proclamation authorizing a $5,000 reward for information leading to an arrest and conviction. UFC president Dana White pledged an additional $25,000 to Ivey's award, and an anonymous source offered $5,000.
The reward later rose to over $105,000, with much of the money coming from the UFC and UFC supporters.

Blanchard's death led to the creation of Aniah's Law, which reforms Alabama's bail laws. Alabama's Constitution guarantees the right to bail for all defendants, except those charged with capital offenses. Aniah's Law would expand the exception to other serious crimes including arson, burglary, domestic violence, aggravated child abuse, assault, robbery, kidnapping, human trafficking, rape, sodomy, sexual torture, terrorism, and murder. Prosecutors would be allowed to request a hearing regarding bail, which a judge could grant or deny. If the hearing is held, the defendant would be allowed to testify, present witnesses, and cross-examine witnesses. Prosecutors would have to demonstrate that the defendant is a flight risk or a threat to the safety of the community. The judge could choose to either allow or deny bail.

Blanchard's parents and step-parents have spoken to legislators in support of the law. In February 2020, the Alabama House of Representatives voted 104–0 in favor of Aniah's Law. In April 2021, the Alabama Senate passed it by a vote of 30 to 0. In June 2021, Governor Kay Ivey signed Aniah’s Law. As of November 8, 2022, Aniah's Law, House Bill 81, was passed by Alabama voters.

See also
List of kidnappings
List of solved missing person cases
 Killing of Shanquella Robinson

References 

2010s missing person cases
Deaths by firearm in Alabama
Deaths by person in Alabama
Formerly missing people
Kidnapped American people
Missing person cases in Alabama
October 2019 events in the United States
History of women in Alabama
Violence against women in the United States